Arde el Cielo is the third live album by the Mexican Latin Pop/Rock band Maná. The album was released on April 29, 2008. This live album was released in three formats CD, CD with DVD, and DVD.

The album was recorded during their Amar es Combatir Tour in two of four shows in San Juan, Puerto Rico at José Miguel Agrelot Coliseum on March 30 and 31, 2007. The first single off the album, "Si No Te Hubieras Ido," was released on March 12, 2008 and quickly became number one on the Hot Latin Tracks.

Maná also recorded 2 studio songs "Arde El Cielo" and "Si No Te Hubieras Ido". This album is the successor to the popular album Amar es Combatir (2006).

Track listing

CD track listing

CD/DVD Edition

Music DVD (cover only)
Arde el Cielo was released in DVD format as well. With the same tracks as the CD/DVD combo edition, this version has two added bonus features, the "Si No Te Hubieras Ido" music video and the Arde El Cielo Electronic Press Kit.

Music DVD Edition

The concert
Fher Olvera changes the lyrics of the song "En el Muelle de San Blas" from San Blas, a Mexican seaside tourist destination, to "San Juan" in order to acknowledge his Puerto Rican audience.

During the last song of the concert, Olvera unfurls a special double flag. It begins with the Mexican flag, then becomes the Puerto Rican flag, to the cheers of the audience.

Personnel
Fher Olvera – main vocals, acoustic & electric guitars, harmonics, and group member
Alex González – drums, coros and group member
Sergio Vallín – acoustic & electric guitars and group member
Juan Diego Calleros – bass and group member

Additional personnel
Juan Carlos Toribio – keyboards
Fernando Vallín – backup guitar, coros
Hector Quintana – percussions, coros

Charts
Arde El Cielo debuted at #30 on the Billboard 200 chart with 17,000 copies sold; it also debuted at #11 on the Billboard Top Rock Albums chart. The disc has been certified double platinum in the US for 400,000 copies as well as gold and platinum in Mexico and Spain for over 120,000 and 40,000 units sold respectively.

Album

Singles

Sales and certifications

References

Live video albums
Maná live albums
2008 video albums
Maná video albums
2008 live albums
Spanish-language live albums